The Samsung Galaxy M10 is an Android smartphone produced by Samsung Electronics, part of the Samsung Galaxy M series online-exclusive budget smartphones. It was unveiled on 28 January 2019 and was released on 5 February that year.

Specifications
The phone is powered by a 1.6 GHz octa-core Exynos 7870 chipset which is based on a 14 nm process and offers eight ARM Cortex-A53 cores clocked at 1.6 GHz. The Samsung M10 equipped with a 6.2-inch HD+ (720x1520 pixels) Infinity-V Display that has a 19:9 aspect ratio and runs on Android 10.

References 

Android (operating system) devices
Samsung smartphones
Mobile phones introduced in 2019
Samsung Galaxy
Mobile phones with multiple rear cameras